Cabo Prior Lighthouse (Cape Nerium as described by Strabo next to the Magnus portus Artabrorum,  Artabri and most northwestern point in Iberia as Strabo says just about the same latitude as the Pyrenees ),  is an active 19th century Spanish lighthouse located on the cabo or cape of the same name in the parish of San Martiño de Covas in the Ferrol municipality  of the Province of A Coruña, Galicia. A set of steps descends from the lighthouse down the steep cliff to a viewpoint overlooking the Atlantic Ocean.

History

Even though it wasn't till the 19th century that the modern lighthouse was built, the geographers of antiquity already took noticed of this granite-protuberance off the most northwestern point of Iberia which not just then, as described by Strabo and other classical geographers, was used as a reference point to bring to an end the Iberian peninsula in the Atlantic north but still are in use today in navigation charts and modern maps .

In Roman times, around the 1st century BC, parts of Iberia with its rough waters were well regarded by mariners, both Phoenician and Roman as good place to trade in metals (like Silver, Gold, Tin and Iron ) as well as wild horses. The rough and unpredictable dangers of the Atlantic, says Strabo, made it difficult for traders but lucky for them nearby there was a magnificent natural port with a good size bay to protect themselves and their wooden made vessels, in the land of the Artabri (or Arrotrebae), the Portus Magnus Artabrorum (Formed not just by the bay of Ferrol but the three rias of Ferrol, Betanzos and Corunna).

The modern-day lighthouse itself, was built in 1853, and consists of a  hexagonal tower, with lantern and gallery, built on the seaward side of a neo-classical one-storey keeper's house.  The whitewashed buildings (now painted beige) are complemented by the masonry detailing, and the stone tower. 
A variety of equipment has been used to emit the all-important light during its history. The original 3rd order Sautter optic produced a fixed white light, was enhanced in 1904 with a system using rotating shutters to emit a 4+2 pattern that used an oil vapour lamp. A new optic was installed in 1926, taken from the lighthouse at Salou. The clockwork system was driven by a weight that would last 8 hours.

It was electrified in 1974, with a new 2.25m diameter optic and a 1500 Watt lamp, with Ruston generators providing electrical power. Also added was an electromagnetic vibrating foghorn emitting the Morse P letter every 25 seconds which was audible up to 7 nautical miles.

With the withdrawal of the lighthouse keepers (torreros) in 1993, the foghorn was taken out of use, and a further upgrade in 1995 meant the light could to be monitored remotely from the port authority control centre. The generators were also replaced at the same time and 1000 Watt halogen lamps were used as a lightsource. In 2007, the lighthouse buildings were renovated and painted beige with new woodwork and shutters.

Operation
In conjunction with the Cabo Prioriño Lighthouse which was built around the same time (what time), it acts as a landfall beacon for the estuary and port at Ferrol, and that of A Coruña.
It is registered under the international Admiralty number D1692 and has the NGA identifier of 113-2460, and is managed and operated by the Ferrol Port Authority.

See also

 List of lighthouses in Spain

References

External links

 Lighthouses of Spain

Lighthouses completed in 1853
Lighthouses in Galicia (Spain)
Buildings and structures in the Province of A Coruña
1853 establishments in Spain